Sandhawalia or Sandhanwalia is a Jat clan of present-day India and Pakistan.

History 

The members of one particular Sandhanwalia Jat Sikh family occupied important positions in the Sikh Confederacy. The progenitor of this family was Choudhary Chanda Singh, who settled at the Sandhu wala village in present-day Pakistan, and consequently, came to be known as Sandhanwalia. His sons migrated to Rajasansi.

Maharaja Ranjit Singh, the Sikh ruler of Punjab, has been described as "Jats" in records. This has led to the view that he belonged to the Jat. According to W. H. McLeod, however, it is more likely that he belonged to the Jat Clan got as the Sandhanwalias. Author Preminder Singh Sandhawalia believes that Ranjit Singh shared lineage with the Sandhawalias, although he did not share a direct line of descent with them.

References

Jat clans
Punjabi tribes